Bonaventura, an Italian name (from Latin Bonaventura, meaning "good fortune") may refer to:

 Bonaventura Bellemo O.F.M. (died 1602), Roman Catholic prelate who served as Bishop of Andros
 Bonaventura Berlinghieri (1228-1274), Italian painter from Lucca, Italy, of the Gothic period
 Fra Bonaventura Bisi (1601-1659), Italian painter of the Baroque period
 Bonaventura Bottone (born 1950), leading operatic tenor from England
 Bonaventura Cerronio (fl. 1639), Italian composer
 Bonaventura Claverio (1606-1671), Roman Catholic prelate who served as Bishop of Potenza 
 Bonaventura Furlani (died 1597), Roman Catholic prelate who served as Bishop of Alatri
 Bonaventura Genelli (1798-1868), German painter
 Bonaventura Gran (1620-1684), Spanish Franciscan friar, proclaimed blessed by the Catholic Church in 1906
 Bonaventura Ibáñez (1876-1932), Spanish film actor of the silent and early sound eras
 Bonaventura Lamberti (1653-1721), Italian painter of the Baroque period, active mainly in Rome
 Bonaventura van Overbeek (1660-1705), Dutch Golden Age draughtsman and engraver
 Bonaventura Porta (1861-1953), Italian Bishop of the Roman Catholic Diocese of Pesaro
 Justinas Bonaventūra Pranaitis (1861-1917), Lithuanian Catholic priest, Russian Master of Theology and Professor of the Hebrew Language
 Bonaventura von Rauch (1740-1814), Prussian Army major general
 Bonaventura Rubino (1600-1668), Italian composer
 Bonaventura Secusio O.F.M. Obs. (died March 1618) was a Roman Catholic prelate who served as Bishop of Catania
 Bonaventura Tornielli O.S.M. (1411-1491), noble Italian priest and Roman Catholic preacher, beatified by Pope Pius X in 1911
 Bonaventura Vulcanius (1538-1614), leading Dutch humanist
 Bonaventura, pseudonym of Ernst August Friedrich Klingemann (1777–1831), a German writer and theatre director
 Bonaventura Moller, inheritor (year 1625.) of Bonaventura manor, located near Riga, Latvia

See also 

 Bonaventura (disambiguation)
 Bonaventura (surname)
 Bonaventure (disambiguation)